The Roman Catholic Diocese of Caraguatatuba is a diocese located in the city of Caraguatatuba in Brazil.

History
 3 March 1999: Established as Diocese of Caraguatatuba from the Diocese of Santos

Leadership
 Bishops of Caraguatatuba (Latin Church)
Fernando Mason, O.F.M. Conv. (1999.03.03 – 2005.05.25) appointed, Bishop of Piracicaba
Antônio Carlos Altieri, S.D.B. (2006.07.26 – 2012.07.11) appointed, Archbishop of Passo Fundo
 José Carlos Chacorowski (2013.06.13 – Incumbent)

References
 GCatholic.org
 Catholic Hierarchy
  Diocese website (Portuguese)

Roman Catholic dioceses in Brazil
Caraguatatuba, Roman Catholic Diocese of
Christian organizations established in 1999
Roman Catholic dioceses and prelatures established in the 20th century
1999 establishments in Brazil